Kennedy County is one of the 141 Cadastral divisions of New South Wales. It is located to the west of the Bogan River in the area around Tottenham and Tullamore.

Kennedy County was named in honour of the explorer Edmund Besley Court Kennedy (1818-1848).

Parishes within this county
A full list of parishes found within this county; their current LGA and mapping coordinates to the approximate centre of each location is as follows:

References

Counties of New South Wales